The Greek National Badminton Championships is a tournament organized to crown the best badminton players in Greece. They are held since 1990.

Past winners

References
Badminton Europe - Details of affiliated national organisations
Hellenic Badminton Yearbook

Badminton tournaments in Greece
National badminton championships
Recurring sporting events established in 1990
Badminton